is a 1954 Japanese science fiction film directed by  Motoyoshi Oda, with special effects and cinematography by Eiji Tsuburaya. The film is a loose adaptation of the 1897 H.G. Wells story The Invisible Man.

Plot 
In Ginza, the dead body of an invisible man is discovered, alongside a suicide note. The note reveals that there is at least one other invisible man still alive. An ex-army commander reveals that during the war, Dr. Nishizaki discovered by chance a particle that, when properly utilized, turns any object invisible. At the end of the Pacific War, a special attack corps made up of invisible men crashed on Saipan Island, and were presumed dead, however, two survived. The effects of the invisibility particle cannot be undone.

Soon, there are robberies across Tokyo from a gang calling themselves the Invisible Men. Meanwhile Nanjo, a clown who works at the cabaret Kurofune befriends a young blind girl, Mariko, who lives in the same apartment. Komatsu, a newspaper reporter who witnessed the death of the invisible man, is investigating the phenomenon and spots Nanjo while visiting a robbed jewelry store. In a fake deal to gather money to cure Mariko's blindness, her grandfather is killed by the gang that has been terrorizing the town.

Soon after, Komatsu, who has been following Nanjo, finds himself alone in a room with him and discovers that Nanjo is, in fact, the other invisible man. He dresses as a clown with face makeup, gloves and so on so as to appear visible and lead a relatively normal life. Nanjo and Komatsu decide to work together to investigate and reveal the identity of the gang that is terrorizing the town and who murdered Mariko's grandfather, while also trying to save Michiyo, a singer who is stuck within the gang and cannot escape. They discover that the gang is led by the same people who own Kurofune, and in an ensuing battle and chase, Nanjo, using his invisibility to his advantage, saves Michiyo and kills Yajima, the gang boss. However, he is also fatally wounded in the fight and becomes visible again. He asks Michiyo to take good care of Mariko in his last breath.

Cast 
 Seizaburo Kawazu as Takemitsu Nanjo, the clown/Invisible Man
 Miki Sanjo as Michiyo, the singer
 Minoru Takada as Yajima, the leader of the "Invisible Gang"
 Yoshio Tsuchiya as Komatsu, the reporter
 Keiko Kondo as Mariko, the blind girl
 Kenjiro Uemura as Ken
  Kamatari Fujiwara as Mari's grandfather
 Sonosuke Sawamura as Nomura, Deitman
 Seijiro Onda as Chief of Police 
 Shoichi Hirose as Policeman
 Takuzo Kumagai as Otsuka 
 Shin Otomo as Detective 
 Noriko Shigeyama as Nightclub Dancer 
 Haruo Suzuki as Men at Nightclub 
 Akira Sera as Man at street stand
 Yutaka Oka as Announcer
 Yasuhisa Tsutsumi as Jewelry Shop Manager
 Jiro Kumagai as Otsuka
 Minoru Ito as Man in car (traffic accident)
 Keiko Mori as Woman in car (traffic accident)
 Haruo Nakajima as Invisible Man Akita

Production

Filming
Tomei Ningen was shot in black-and-white at academy ratio. The special effects were directed by Eiji Tsuburaya. David Kalat noted that Tsuburaya's special effects were "clever but sparingly used." Tomei Ningen was a primary influence on Toho's Mutant Series, a trilogy of science-fiction films produced from 1958 to 1960 (The H-Man, The Secret of the Telegian and The Human Vapor).

Special effects
The scene where Nanjo scrubs off his clown makeup, revealing his invisibility was achieved with Kawazu gradually covering his face with black greasepaint; when combined with a separately photographed background, the dark shades became see-through, and the actor seemed to wipe away his very being.

For scenes where Nanjo throws things or moves the around, piano wire was used to simulate the invisible man holding these objects.

Release
Tomei Ningen was released in Japan by Toho on December 29, 1954. Any release of the film in the United States is undetermined. No evidence exists that it was ever dubbed in English.

Daiei Film produced two similar films featuring invisibility, The Invisible Man Appears in 1949, and The Invisible Man vs. The Human Fly in 1957.

References

Footnotes

Sources

External links 
 

Films directed by Motoyoshi Oda
1954 films
Japanese black-and-white films
Films based on The Invisible Man
Films set in Tokyo
Toho films
Japanese science fiction films
1950s science fiction films
1950s Japanese films